Juan Cruz (born 1966) is a television and film director and screenwriter. He co-directed the 2005 film Tapas as his directorial film debut.

Filmography
 Incidencias 2015
 Pelotas (TV series) 2009–2010
 Universos (TV series) 2008
 Cowards 2008
 XXI Premios Anuales de la Academia (TV special) 2007
 Tapas 2005
 Ratones coloraos (TV series) 2002
 Set de nit (TV series) 2001
 A pèl (TV series) 2001
 El olor de las manzanas (short) (writer) 1999

External links
 

Spanish film directors
Living people
1966 births